Miss International 2023 will be the 61st Miss International pageant. Jasmin Selberg of Germany will crown her successor at the end of the event.

Contestants
As of March 19, 2023, 14 contestants have been confirmed:

Notes

Upcoming pageants

References

External links
 

2023 beauty pageants
2023